Marcela Sapone (born March 9, 1986) is an American entrepreneur. She is the CEO of New York-based startup Hello Alfred, which she co-founded with Jessica Beck in 2014 while in business school.

Through Hello Alfred, Sapone has become a staunch advocate for pro-labor policies, and was among the first founders in the sharing economy to write on the importance of meaningful work and a meaningful income for employees. She has worked with the Brookings Institution, the Secretary of Labor and the White House under the Obama Administration.
 
Sapone has been recognized for her work and was named one of Goldman Sachs' "most intriguing entrepreneurs", Fast Company's Most Creative People and a winner of TechCrunch Disrupt SF. She was also nominated for the Financial Times' ArcelorMittal Boldness in Business Award, and was the face of Consumer Tech for Forbes 30 Under 30 in 2016.
 
As an undergrad at Boston University, Sapone created her own degree program. She took classes that enticed her including photojournalism, cognitive science,  Zen meditation and management courses. 

Sapone holds an MBA with distinction from Harvard Business School. Prior to founding Hello Alfred, she began her career as a consultant at McKinsey & Company before working in private equity. She has also co-created WHITESPACE, a seed-stage venture fund.

References

1986 births
Living people
American women chief executives
American women company founders
American company founders
American technology chief executives
Boston University alumni
Harvard Business School alumni
21st-century American women